Charadra deridens (laugher or marbled tuffet moth) is a moth of the family Noctuidae. It is found in Ontario, Quebec, New Brunswick, Nova Scotia, Prince Edward Island, British Columbia, Saskatchewan and Manitoba in Canada, through most of the United States except the south-western states.

The wingspan is 38–48 mm. Adults are on wing from May to August in the north. They have an extended season in Florida.

The larvae feed on the leaves of beech. Other recorded hosts include birch, elm, maple and oak.

External links
Bug Guide
Images

Pantheinae
Moths of North America
Moths described in 1852